The 2006 Southern Conference men's basketball tournament took place from March 2–5, 2006 at the North Charleston Coliseum in North Charleston, South Carolina. The #3 seed Davidson Wildcats defeated the Chattanooga Mocs in the championship game to win their 8th title and receive the automatic berth to the 2006 NCAA tournament.

Format
All eleven teams were eligible for the tournament. The tournament used a preset bracket consisting of four rounds, the first of which featured three games, with the winners moving on to the quarterfinal round. The fourth and fifth seeds also received automatic byes to the quarterfinal round and played each other.

Bracket

* Overtime game

See also
List of Southern Conference men's basketball champions

References

Tournament
Southern Conference men's basketball tournament
Southern Conference men's basketball tournament
Southern Conference men's basketball tournament